The Battle of Batala took place in December 1764 as part of the Afghan-Sikh Wars between the Durrani Empire and the Sikhs. Ahmad Shah Durrani and his force marched towards Batala after their defeat at Jandiala and as soon as they reached Batala, Sikhs opposed them and a battle took place where Durranis were defeated and Afghan commander Sarbuland Khan was wounded.

Background
Ahmad Shah Abdali marched his seventh campaign into India after hearing reports about the Sikh triumphs. Ahmad Shah Abdali marched towards Sarhind and decided to pass through Upper Bari and Jallandar Doab as this was the area where not only the Sikhs lived but was also richly fertile for the soldiers to feed themselves on the way. Along the way, the Afghans destroyed the home and crops of the Sikhs and as Ahmad Shah and his forces got nearer to the town of Jandiala, the Sikhs opposed them and a battle took place resulting in the defeat of Afghans at Battle of Jandiala. Afghan commander Rahim Khan Bakhshi was killed in the battle. After defeat Ahmad Shah Durrani marched towards Batala, reaching the town in 15 days of his travel from Lahore.

Battle
When Abdali and his forces reached Batala, the Sikhs opposed them and a battle took place resulting in the defeat of Afghans. Afghan commander Sarbuland Khan was wounded in the battle.

Aftermath
After the defeat Ahmad Shah Abdali and his remaining soldiers traveled towards Adinanagar.

References 

Battles involving the Durrani Empire
Battles involving the Sikhs